Hearts and Diamonds may refer to:

Hearts and Diamonds (1912 film), 1912 silent film directed by Harold M. Shaw
Hearts and Diamonds (1914 film), 1914 silent film directed by George D. Baker
Hearts and Diamonds, 2000 album by Eddy Grant